Paweł Wojtala (27 October 1972) is a Polish former footballer who played as a defender. He spent most of his career in his native Poland and in Germany. He won 12 caps with the Poland national team.

Whilst at Werder Bremen he helped them win the 1998–99 DFB-Pokal, playing as a substitute in the final against Bayern Munich as Bremen won on penalties.

References

External links
 
 

Living people
1972 births
Association football defenders
Polish footballers
Poland international footballers
Lech Poznań players
Widzew Łódź players
Hamburger SV players
SV Werder Bremen players
Legia Warsaw players
Rot-Weiß Oberhausen players
Rot Weiss Ahlen players
Karlsruher SC players
Warta Poznań players
Hallescher FC players
Wolfsberger AC players
Ekstraklasa players
Bundesliga players
2. Bundesliga players
Footballers from Poznań